Hotel Marcel is a Hilton hotel in the Long Wharf district of New Haven, Connecticut. It is housed in the Armstrong Rubber Company Building, later known as the Pirelli Tire Building: a former office building designed by modernist architect Marcel Breuer. The structure is a noted example of Brutalist architecture. Since its renovation into a hotel, the building operates as a zero-energy building, generating enough renewable energy to sustain its operations.

The building was constructed from 1968 to 1970 for the headquarters of the Armstrong Rubber Company. Pirelli purchased the site in 1988, and resold the building soon afterward. From the late 1990s into the late 2010s, the building was predominantly vacant. The building was listed on the Connecticut Register of Historic Places in 2000 and the National Register of Historic Places in 2021. Conversion to a hotel commenced in 2020, leading to the Hotel Marcel's opening in May 2022.

Attributes

Site and exterior 

The building is situated near the Connecticut Turnpike (part of I-95) and New Haven Harbor, and is adjacent to an IKEA store.

The building was designed by modernist architects Marcel Breuer and Robert F. Gatje in the Brutalist style. It has 36 bays along its length and 13 bays at its sides, with a flat roof. It has a heavy mass, constructed primarily from concrete. Its facade is constructed entirely of pre-cast concrete paneling designed to provide sun protection and visual depth. It has a two-story base with thick columns above it, leaving a 17-foot gap between the base and a five-story upper section. The roughly two-story gap was originally intended to lower the noise from the building's two-story research, development, and productions laboratories, allowing the administrative office spaces above to be quieter. The design allowed two floors to be added into the space in the future.

The building has a steel frame. It was one of the first buildings in which the floor framing was suspended from overhead cantilevered trusses. Each of the seven 50-ton trusses supported the steel-framed block below them.

At the northeast corner of the building is a freestanding three-story concrete structure, formerly a sign for the Armstrong Rubber Company. The structure, built concurrently with the building, contributes to the site's National Register of Historic Places listing.

Interior and hotel use
The building was constructed as the headquarters for Armstrong Rubber Company, including office and research space.

The interior was converted into a hotel from 2020 to 2022. The Brooklyn-based design studio Dutch East Design was hired for the interior design and branding for the hotel. The hotel includes 165 guest rooms, a lobby, a restaurant called BLDG, bar, and event space. It is operated by Hilton's Tapestry brand. Since its renovation, the building has had numerous energy efficiency installations. These include triple-glazed windows to stabilize inside temperatures, all-electric machinery for laundry and kitchens, as well as solar panels covering its parking lot and hotel roof. In 2021, the panels were estimated to generate 700,000 kilowatt hours per year, enough to cover the hotel's needs. Other sustainability measures include 14 EV charging stations and an electric 14-person shuttle for those without cars. There are approximately 130 parking spaces for hotel guests on a surface lot by the building.

The building's lobby retains original features including a set of stairs, granite floor tiles, and wall tiles, as well as one of its original pieces of furniture: a polished granite reception desk, moved across the hall into a vestibule near an event space.

The hotel rooms are designed with contrasting grays and walnut wood. They feature Cesca chairs, designed by Marcel Breuer, as well as custom modular furniture for storage designed by Dutch East Design. The largest rooms are on the eighth floor, in the former executive suites. Many of these feature couches, kitchenettes, and soaking tubs. The east-facing rooms look out over New Haven Harbor, while the west-facing rooms look out over the New Haven skyline.

The top floor of the building is two stories in height, without windows. It primarily housed mechanical equipment, though the hotel renovation modified much of the space.

History

Early history 

Armstrong Rubber Co. first initiated the building's construction in 1966 with the presentation of a proposal to develop a site at the intersection of Interstates 91 and 95 to then-mayor of New Haven, Richard C. Lee. Lee allowed the purchase on the condition the firm would hire a world-renowned architect; Lee desired New Haven to become "America's model city". While the company originally proposed a low rise structure, Lee suggested a building with eight to ten stories. In response, the project's architect, Marcel Breuer, designed a plan suspending the company's administrative offices two stories above a two-story research and development space. The negative space between the building's two forms was intended to reduce sound in the offices from the development labs below.

The building was completed in 1970 at a cost of $6.5 million. It would serve Armstrong Rubber for 18 years. In 1988, Pirelli purchased the company. It sold the site to mall developers in June 1999, who aimed to build a large mall on the site, with Nordstrom as one of the anchors. The project was abandoned by 2000, and mall company Westfield America purchased the site in March 2001.

Beginning in May 1999 and spanning over a decade, the Pirelli Tire Building was unoccupied and largely unused, as plans evolved for the site. The lack of use was criticized by preservation groups as encouraging demolition by neglect. A vandal broke into the building in 1999, stealing $50 in copper piping, though causing thousands of dollars in damage.

When plans for a mall on the site began to take traction, the possibility of the demolition of the Breuer building led to efforts to list the site on the Connecticut Register of Historic Places. It was listed in 2000, following efforts by city officials, preservationists, and the New Haven Arts Council's Alliance for Architecture.

Partial demolition 
The furniture manufacturer IKEA purchased the site in 2003, soon after announcing plans to build an adjacent store and demolish a  section of the building for 150 parking spaces. The plan was criticized by the Long Wharf Advocacy Group, a local coalition that sought to pursue alternatives for the site that better preserved the structure. The Connecticut chapter of the American Institute of Architects criticized the plan as well. Despite community criticism, IKEA demolished most of the low-rise portion of the structure in April 2003 for construction of a parking lot, saving only the portion below the suspended offices; the demolition was criticized for disrupting the intended asymmetrical visual balance of the structure. IKEA's store on the site opened in July 2004; the company used the building and its sign to hang massive billboard-like advertisements on the structures, facing the interstate.

Current use 
During its vacancy, the building occasionally saw temporary exhibition uses. In 2002, it hosted hundreds of artists as part of the annual "City-Wide Open Studios" event. In 2017, New-Haven-born visual artist Tom Burr utilized the entire first floor of a conceptual art exhibition titled Body/Building.

In 2018, reports emerged of the possible development of a hotel on the site. In December 2019, the  property containing the building was purchased from IKEA for $1.2 million by Connecticut architect and developer Becker + Becker, who announced plans to convert it into a "net zero energy boutique hotel and conference center". The building was also planned to be the first Passive House-certified hotel in the U.S., meaning it generates its own heat, electricity, and hot water. IKEA had rejected several previous offers for the property, though was encouraged by Becker's plans enough to sell the property. It opened as the 165-room Hotel Marcel, named for its architect, on May 16, 2022.

The building was listed on the National Register of Historic Places in 2021.

The hotel renovation included few exterior changes, save for new windows and power-washing the concrete. The work instead focused on modern interiors and sustainability efforts including solar panels, a battery system, and all-electric mechanical equipment. The renovators aim for the hotel to become one of few LEED Platinum-certified hotel buildings in the United States. Becker + Becker hired Violette de La Selle as the site's project manager.

Reception 
The building has faced considerable public criticism. According to Business Insider in 2018, the building was rated as the state's ugliest by Connecticut residents. The building is however supported by architects including the Connecticut chapter of the American Institute of Architects and the preservation group Docomomo. Financial Times listed it in "Architecture to see in 2023", as a striking Brutalist landmark and a successful renovation following new life brought to the Marcel Breuer-designed 945 Madison Avenue, serving the Frick Collection.

See also 
 National Register of Historic Places listings in New Haven, Connecticut

References

External links

 
 Connecticut Register nomination form

Brutalist architecture in Connecticut
Buildings and structures in New Haven, Connecticut
Commercial buildings completed in 1970
Commercial buildings on the National Register of Historic Places in Connecticut
Hilton Worldwide
Hotel buildings completed in 1970
Hotel buildings on the National Register of Historic Places in Connecticut
Hotels established in 2022
IKEA
Marcel Breuer buildings
National Register of Historic Places in New Haven, Connecticut